Hisham's Palace, also known as Khirbat al-Mafjar, is an important early Islamic archaeological site in the Palestinian city of Jericho, in the West Bank. Built by the Umayyad dynasty in the first half of the 8th century, it is one of the so-called Umayyad desert castles. It is located 3 km north of Jericho's city center, in an area governed by the Palestinian National Authority (PNA).

Also associated with the site is a large park or agricultural enclosure (ḥayr) which extends east of the palace. The entire complex - palace, baths, and farm - was connected by an elaborate water system to nearby springs.

Excavation history
The site was discovered in 1873. The northern area of the site was noted, but not excavated, in 1894 by F. J. Bliss, but the major source of archaeological information comes from the excavations of Palestinian archaeologist, Dimitri Baramki between 1934 and 1948. In 1959 Baramki's colleague, colonial administrator for the British Mandate government Robert Hamilton, published the major work on Hisham's Palace, Khirbat al-Mafjar: An Arabian Mansion in the Jordanian Valley. Baramki's archaeological research is unfortunately absent from this volume, and as such, Hamilton's analysis is exclusively art historical. Baramki's research on the archaeological aspects of the site, particularly the ceramics, was published in various preliminary reports and articles in the Quarterly of the Department of Antiquities in Palestine. Many of the finds from Baramki and Hamilton's excavations are now held in the Rockefeller Museum in Jerusalem.

In 2006, new excavations were carried out under the direction of Dr. Hamdan Taha of the Palestinian National Authority's Ministry of Tourism and Antiquities. Current research is being conducted by the Jericho Mafjar Project, a collaboration between the ministry and archaeologists from the University of Chicago.

In 2015, an agreement was signed between the Palestinian Ministry of Tourism and Antiquities and the Japan International Cooperation Agency to enable the  mosaic in the palace, one of the largest in the world, to be uncovered and readied for display.

History
It is difficult to establish a secure historical framework for Hisham's Palace. No textual sources reference the site, and archaeological excavations are the only source of further information. An ostracon bearing the name "Hisham" was found during the course of Baramki's excavations. This was interpreted as evidence for the site's construction during the reign of the caliph Hishām ibn ʿAbd al-Malik. Robert Hamilton subsequently argued that the palace was a residence of al-Walid ibn Yazid, a nephew of Hisham who was famous for his extravagant lifestyle. Archaeologically it is certain that the site is a product of the Umayyad dynasty in the first half of the 8th century, although the specifics of its patronage and use remain unknown.

As an archaeological site, Hisham's Palace belongs to the category of desert castles. These are a collection of monuments dating to the Umayyad dynasty and found throughout Syria, Jordan, Israel, and the West Bank. Although there is great variation in the size, location, and presumed function of these different sites, they can be connected to the patronage of different figures in the Umayyad ruling family. Some of the desert castles, for example Qasr Hallabat or Qasr Burqu, represent Islamic occupations of earlier Roman or Ghassanid structures. Other sites like Qastal, Qasr Azraq, or al-Muwaqqar are associated with trade routes and scarce water resources. With a few exceptions, the desert castles conform to a common template consisting of a square palace similar to Roman forts, a bath house, water reservoir or dam, and often an agricultural enclosure. Various interpretations for the desert castles exist, and it is unlikely that one single theory can explain the variety observed in the archaeological record.

The site is commonly thought to have been destroyed during the earthquake of 749 and then abandoned, but an analysis of Baramki's detailed reporting shows that this is incorrect. Instead the ceramic record indicates that the occupation continued through the Ayyubid-Mamluk period, with a significant phase of occupation between 900 and 1000 during the Abbasid and Fatimid periods. Further excavations will no doubt contribute to a more detailed picture of the site's continued use through different periods. A 2013 geological investigation of the site suggest the palace was destroyed by the later earthquake of 1033. Evidence of faulting and damage corresponded to a more severe earthquake than that of 749.

Architecture
The palace, bath complex, and external mosque are enclosed by a retaining wall. The southern gate was known from Baramki's excavations, but the recent discovery of a northern gate in alignment indicates that the development of Hisham's Palace was conceived of as a complete unit to be constructed at once.

Palace

The largest building at the site is the palace, a roughly square building with round towers at the corners. It originally had two stories. Entrance was through a gate on the center of the east side. The inner rooms were aligned around a central paved portico (riwaq), which featured an underground cellar or sirdab (basement; elsewhere also underground corridor or tunnel), for refuge from the heat. The room to the south of the portico was a mosque with a mihrab built into the outer wall.

Outer pavilion and mosque
In the courtyard east of the palace-and-baths complex was a pavilion containing a monumental fountain. A second, larger mosque was located inside the complex, north of the palace gateway.

Bath complex
The bath complex is located just north of the palace across an open area. This free-standing structure is almost 30 meters square, more precisely , and three of its sides feature round exedrae which project out from the building, three each to the south and west, and two to the east. The east face of the bath had an ornate entrance in its center, flanked by exedrae. Along much of the southern side of the main, square hall is a pool. The  interior floor surface of the bath complex was paved with spectacular mosaic decoration. A special reception room, or diwan, was entered from the northwest corner. The floor of this room is paved with the famous "tree of life" mosaic, depicting a lion and gazelles at the foot of a tree.

The actual bathing rooms were attached to the northern wall of the complex, and were heated from below the floor by hypocausts.

Agricultural annex
To the north of the bath complex are the ruins of a large square structure which has clearly gone through many phases of reuse and reconstruction. This part of the site was initially assumed to be a khan or caravanserai, but recent excavations have indicated that the northern area had an agricultural function connected to the hayr or agricultural enclosure during the Umayyad and Abbasid periods.

Photo gallery

Decorative elements
The decorative elements at Hisham's Palace are some of the finest representations of Umayyad period art and are well documented in the publications of Robert Hamilton.

Mosaics
The floor of the main bathing hall is covered with colorful geometric mosaics, at the center of which is a large kaleidoscope design. The enormous mosaic is divided into 25 square bays that are separated by pier clusters. A large variety of geometric designs cover the floor, which are rarely repeated.  The colors used are primarily blue, red, green, yellow, and orange. After years of restoration funded by Japan, the mosaic covering , one of the largest floor mosaics in the world, with more than five million distinctive pieces of stone from Palestine, was unveiled in October 2021. This floor mosaic is one of the largest that has survived from the ancient world.

The most famous mosaic at the site is the "Tree of Life" mosaic in the diwan, or the private audience room, located in the northwestern corner of the main bathing hall. The semi-circle pavement mosaic depicts a fruiting tree with two unknowing gazelles on the left side and a lion attacking another gazelle on the right side. It is a popular design throughout Islamic history in places like Northern Syria and Transjordan, and has been a popular topic of conversation as there are numerous theories related to its meaning. One idea is that the mosaic represents the peace that the caliph brought with his military prowess. Another idea stems from the border of the mosaic, which resembles the tassels of a curtain or drape. During the Umayyad, Abbasid, and Fatimid periods, court accounts recall that the caliphs sat behind curtains from where they appeared at specified moments in various rituals. The tassels that border the "Tree of Life" mosaic may suggest that the scene of the lion and gazelles should be understood through a lense of intimacy.

All of the mosaics found at Hisham's Palace are of very high quality and feature a wide variety of colors and figural motifs.

Carved stucco
The carved stucco found at the site is also of exceptional quality. Of particular note is the statue depicting a male figure with a sword, often presumed to be the caliph, which stood in a niche above the entrance to the bath hall. Additional male and female figures carved in stucco, some semi-nude, adorn the bath complex. Geometric and vegetal patterns are also quite common.

While Hamilton described the carvings at Hisham's Palace as amateurish and chaotic, many subsequent art historians have noted similarities with Iranian themes. Hana Taragan has argued that the artistic themes seen at the site are Levantine examples of an Islamic visual language of power that coalesced from Sasanian influences in Iraq. Priscilla Soucek has also drawn attention to the site's representation of the Islamic myth of Solomon.

Photo gallery

Conservation
According to Global Heritage Fund (GHF), the rapid urban development of Jericho, as well as expansion of agricultural activity in the area, are limiting archaeologists' access to the site, much of which remain unexplored. Conservation efforts aimed at protecting important structures have been hindered by lack of resources. In a 2010 report titled Saving Our Vanishing Heritage, GHF identified Hisham's Palace as one of 12 worldwide heritage sites most "On the Verge" of irreparable loss and destruction. H. Taha, director of antiquities has published reports concerning the preservation of this and other sites in the Jericho region.

In 2021, the restoration of the bath complex's 835-square-meter mosaic floor was completed, at a cost of 12 million USD and with Japanese funding, with a dome-shaped shelter protecting the mosaics, which was designed and executed by a Japanese architecture office. The mosaics can be admired from walkways suspended over the floor.

Tourism
Hisham's Palace is one of the most important Islamic monuments in Palestine, and is a major attraction for both visitors and Palestinians. In 2010, according to figures collected by the Palestinian Ministry of Tourism and Antiquities, the site received 43,455 visitors. The site is a common field trip destination for Palestinian schoolchildren. Foreign visitors who enter Palestine through the nearby Allenby Bridge often make Hisham's Palace their first stop. The site has been visited by foreign dignitaries, and was the set for a production of Shakespeare's Richard II in 2012.

Since 2021, the mosaic floor of the bath complex has been opened to the public after the completion of restoration and preservation work and the building of a shelter provided with walkways placed above the floor.

See also
Desert castles
History of medieval Arabic and Western European domes

References

Further reading
Baer, Eva. "Khirbat al-Mafjar." Encyclopaedia of Islam 2nd ed.
Bliss, F.J. (1894) "Notes on the Plain of Jericho." Palestinian Exploration Fund Quarterly Statement. 175–183.
Bacharach, Jere. (1996) "Marwanid Umayyad Building Activities: Speculations on Patronage." Muqarnas Vol. 13: 27–44.
Hamilton, Robert W. (1959) Khirbat al-Mafjar: An Arabian Mansion in the Jordan Valley Oxford: Oxford UP.
Hamilton, Robert W. (1988) Walid and his Friends: An Umayyad Tragedy Oxford: Oxford UP.
Soucek, Priscilla. (1993) "Solomon's Throne/Solomon's Bath: Model or Metaphor." Ars Orientalis Vol. 23: 109–134.
Taha, Hamdan. (2005) "Rehabilitation of Hisham's Palace in Jericho." in F. Maniscalco ed. Tutela, Conservazione e Valorizzazione del Patrimonio Culturale della Palestina. Naples. 179–188.
Taragan, Hana. (2003) "Atlas Transformed--Interpreting the 'Supporting Figures' in the Umayyad Palace at Khirbat al-Mafjar." East and West Vol. 53: 9–29.
Whitcomb, Donald. (1988) "Khirbat al-Mafjar Reconsidered: The Ceramic Evidence". Bulletin of the American Schools of Oriental Research 271: 51–67.
Whitcomb, Donald and Taha, Hamdan. (2013) ""Khirbat al-Mafjar and Its Place in the Archaeological Heritage of Palestine" Journal of Eastern Mediterranean Archaeology & Heritage Studies 1(1): 54–65.
Whitcomb, Donald and Taha, Hamdan. (2014) The Mosaics of Khirbet el-Mafjar Hisham's Palace

External links

The Jericho Mafjar Project
Khirbat al-Mafjar at ArchNet.
Explore Hisham's Palace with Google Earth on Global Heritage Network
Dimitri Baramki: Discovering Qasr Hisham, by Donald Whitcomb, 2014, Jerusalem Quarterly, Institute for Palestine Studies
Photos of Khirbat al Mafjar at the Manar al-Athar photo archive

Umayyad palaces
Umayyad architecture in the State of Palestine
Archaeological sites in the West Bank
Buildings and structures in Jericho